

The Blériot 125 (or Bl-125) was a highly unusual French airliner of the early 1930s. Displayed at the 1930 Salon de l'Aéronautique in Paris, it featured accommodation for twelve passengers in separate twin fuselages. Between them, these pods shared a tailplane and a high wing.  The centre section of wing joined the fuselage pods and also carried a nacelle that contained an engine at either end and the crew compartment in the middle. When flown the following year, it displayed very poor flight characteristics and although attempts to improve it continued on into 1933, certification could not be achieved and the sole prototype was scrapped the following year.

Specifications

References

External links

 "Aircraft With Twin Cabins Carries Larger Loads", September 1931, Popular Mechanics
 "Cabins Under Wings Of Plane For Passenger Service" Popular Mechanics, August 1933
 "Report on Paris Air Show"l Flight 12 Dec 1930

125
1930s French airliners
Twin-boom aircraft
Twin-engined push-pull aircraft
High-wing aircraft
Aircraft first flown in 1931
Twin-fuselage aircraft